Don't Bother to Knock (released as Why Bother to Knock in the United States) is a 1961 British comedy film directed by Cyril Frankel from a screenplay by Denis Cannan and Frederic Gotfurt, based on the 1959 novel of the same name by Clifford Hanley. It stars Richard Todd, Nicole Maurey, Elke Sommer, June Thorburn, Rik Battaglia and Judith Anderson.

Premise
Bill Ferguson, a travel agent in Edinburgh, has an argument with his girlfriend Stella after he loses the key to his apartment. Unnoticed by Bill, Maggie, an American business associate of his, finds his key in his trouser cuff where he had dropped it, but, before returning it, she makes a copy of the key and gives Bill a gift of a case containing several copies of the key with his address on an attached metal tag.

Subsequently travelling around Europe on a business trip, Bill has romantic encounters with three women, giving each one a standing invitation to visit him when in Edinburgh plus one of the keys to his flat. When two of them, plus the daughter of the other, arrive at about the same time to attend the Edinburgh Festival, they all decide to stay with Bill, and Bill has to cope with the women all meeting each other, as well as Stella finding out about them.

Cast
 Richard Todd as Bill Ferguson
 Nicole Maurey as Lucille
 Elke Sommer as Ingrid
 June Thorburn as Stella
 Rik Battaglia as Gulio
 Judith Anderson as Maggie
 Dawn Beret as Harry
 Scott Finch as Perry
 Eleanor Summerfield as Mother
 John Le Mesurier as Father
 Colin Gordon as Rolsom
 Kenneth Fortescue as Ian
 Ronald Fraser as Fred
 Tommy Duggan as Al
 Michael Shepley as Colonel
 Joan Sterndale-Bennett as Spinster
 Amanda Barrie as American Girl
 Warren Mitchell as waiter (uncredited)

References

External links
 
 
 
 
 

1961 films
1961 comedy films
British comedy films
CinemaScope films
Films based on British novels
Films directed by Cyril Frankel
Films scored by Elisabeth Lutyens
Films set in Edinburgh
Films shot at Associated British Studios
Films shot in Edinburgh
1960s English-language films
1960s British films